Cannonball's Bossa Nova is a 1962 album by jazz musician Julian "Cannonball" Adderley. First released on Riverside in 1963, the album was reissued on Capitol Records several times with different covers and titles.

Reception
The Allmusic review by Al Campbell awarded the album 2 stars and states: "Unfortunately this release contains little fire, as Adderley didn't get much rehearsal time with these musicians. Combined with the repetitious nature of the Bossa Nova these proceedings can get tedious." The Penguin Guide to Jazz awarded the album 3 stars, stating: "Cannonball's Bossa Nova finds Adderley on a Brazilian vacation, with some of the local talent. Little more than a sweet-natured excursion into some of the indigenous music, it's a pleasing diversion."

Track listing
 "Clouds" (Durval Ferreira, Maurício Einhorn) – 4:54
 "Minha Saudade" (João Donato) – 2:22
 "Corcovado" (Antonio Carlos Jobim) – 6:44
 "Batida Differente" (Ferreira, Einhorn) – 3:25
 "Joyce's Samba" (Ferreira, Einhorn) – 3:12
 "Groovy Samba" (Sérgio Mendes) – 4:59
 "O Amor Em Paz (Once I Loved)" (Jobim, Vinicius de Moraes, João Gilberto) – 7:47
 "Sambop" (Ferreira, Einhorn) – 3:34

Bonus tracks on CD reissue:
"Corcovado" [Alternate Take] – 5:35
 "Clouds" [Single Version] – 2:41

Personnel
Cannonball Adderley - alto saxophone
 The musicians forming the loosely studio group "Bossa Rio Sextet of Brazil", were:
Sérgio Mendes - piano
Durval Ferreira - guitar
Octavio Bailly, Jr. - bass
Dom Um Romão - drums
Pedro Paulo - trumpet (#2, 4-5, 7-8)
Paulo Moura - alto saxophone (#2, 4-5, 7-8)

References

1963 albums
Cannonball Adderley albums
Albums produced by Orrin Keepnews
Riverside Records albums